Vasilije born Vasilije Jovanović-Brkić (Sremski Karlovci, Austrian Empire, 1719 - Imperial Russia, 10 February 1772) was a Serbian metropolitan of Dabar and Bosnia who managed to depose and succeed Patriarch Kirilo II in 1763, and become the new Serbian Patriarch.

Vasilije Brkić, the last Serbian patriarch before the abolition of the Peć Patriarchate in 1766, wrote a report in 1771 for the needs of the Russian Government on the areas known to him that were under the Turks.

Biography
Vasilije Jovanović-Brkić was born in 1719 in Sremski Karlovci. He had a happy childhood in the home of his father Jovan, who was a teacher. From 1732 to 1738, Vasilije attended a Latin college (Collegium slavono-latino carloviciense) headed by Emanuel Kozačinski at the same time as Vasilije Nenadović, the nephew of Metropolitan Pavle Nenadović. Later, the Austrian authorities closed the school and prohibited the Serbian youth to pursue higher education in their own language. in the meantime, Vasilije was elevated to protodeacon by Arsenije IV Jovanović Šakabenta and with that post, he was the supervisor of all deacons in the Metropolitanate of Sremski Karlovci. He supported and funded Hristofor Žefarović's monumental work. In 1749 Vasilije became a suspect when he took too many liberties with the church treasury and the Bačka bishop Visarion Pavlović, the Abbot of Remeta Atanasije Isaijević, and the Kotor providur Ivan Zusta accused him of absconding. Finding himself in a predicament he chose to leave Austria for Serbia.
Greek Patriarch Cyrill II appointed Vasilije bishop of Novo Brdo, and then transferred him to the metropolitan in Sarajevo. Vasilije Brkić managed to remove Cyril II from the patriarchal chair with the help of Serbian bishops. He was appointed patriarch of Peć in 1763. As a victim of intrigue in which the relatives of the previous (replaced) patriarch (a Greek) were involved in slandering Brkić for espionage, Vasilije was removed from the position of patriarch by the Turkish authorities and detained on the island of Cyprus. With the help of members of the French diplomatic corps, Vasilije was released from prison and managed to escape from Cyprus to southern Dalmatia, and then to Janjevo, from where he went to Montenegro in 1767. There he met the Russian prince Yuri Vladimirovich Dolgorukov who Montenegro to interrogate the False Emperor Šćepan Mali. Together they went to Trieste and then to Livorno, thanks to transport arrangements made by Russian Admiral Count Alexei Grigoryevich Orlov (1737–1808). At the request of Orlov, he wrote a "Description of Turkish areas and Christian peoples in them, especially the Serbian people".

The Aftermath
Then came Patriarch Kalinik II (1765-1766) the last patriarch (of Greek origin) on the throne of the Patriarchate of Peć. He and the Greek bishops were forced to ask that the Patriarchate of Peć be abolished, allegedly due to over-indebtedness. At the suggestion of the Ecumenical Patriarch Samuel Hanceris (1763-1769), Sultan Mustafa III (1757-1774) accepted these requests and abolished the Serbian Patriarchate due to "over-indebtedness" - the berat of 11 September 1766. The consequences of the abolition of the Patriarchate of Peć were terrible - Serb Gorani, Maglenci and other Serbs between Voden and Lerin converted to Islam.

Works
 "Description of Turkish areas and Christian peoples in them, especially the Serbian people"
 Sluzbu i Sineksar Sv. Vasilija Ostrogskom

References

Sources

External links
 Official site of the Serbian Orthodox Church: Serbian Archbishops and Patriarchs

Kirilo II
18th-century Greek people
Greeks from the Ottoman Empire
1719 births
1772 deaths